Panoche Pass is a mountain pass within the Diablo Range in San Benito County, California connecting the southern extremity of the Santa Clara Valley in the west to the Panoche Valley and San Joaquin Valley in the east.  The name Panoche Pass is used for the United States Geological Survey quadrangle map for the local area.  County Route J1, also known as the Panoche Road, traverses the pass.

Curiously, the elevation of  posted on the official highway sign is at least  higher than that indicated on the official USGS topographic map of the area.

Natural history
The headwaters of Panoche Creek are located at Panoche Pass.

The locale has numerous flora and fauna species. There are also a number of wildflower species including the iconic yellow mariposa lily, Calochortus luteus, which has been specifically noted in the Panoche Pass.

See also
 Panoche Hills
 Pacheco Pass lies to the north of Panoche Pass and is more heavily travelled
 New Idria, California

Notes

References
 David L. Durham. 2000. Durham's place names of California's Central Coast, page 145 of 241 pages
 C. Michael Hogan. 2009. Yellow Mariposa Lily: Calochortus luteus, GlobalTwitcher.com, ed. N. Stromberg

External links
  July 25, 1861: Panoche Pass, Up and Down California, Reliving the Whitney Survey…150 years later

Mountain passes of California
Landforms of San Benito County, California
Diablo Range